Alexander Romanov (born December 11, 1990) is a Moldovan mixed martial artist and freestyle wrestler, who competes in the heavyweight division of the Ultimate Fighting Championship (UFC). As of March 13, 2023, he is #15 in the UFC heavyweight rankings.

Wrestling career 
Romanov started training in freestyle wrestling at age seven. He has made four Moldovan World Teams (two as a senior and two as a junior) and eight European Teams (five as a senior, three as an age-group wrestler). His best result has been a bronze medal at the 2016 World University Championships. His last performance to date took place at the 2020 European Wrestling Championships, where he placed twelfth. He is also a two-time UWW grappling European bronze medalist.

Romanov studied at law faculty of Comrat State University and pedagogical faculty of Chișinău Sport Institute.

Alexandr Romanov also competed in sumo for a brief time. While his time in the sport was not long, he won silver in the OPEN European Cup in 2016.

Mixed martial arts career

Early career 
Early in his career after his stint in wrestling, Romanov found Chesea Eduard, a Muay Thai coach. Eduard brought Romanov into the sport of MMA and remains his coach to this day.

Romanov compiled a record of 11 wins and no losses while competing in his native Moldova, primarily at Eagles Fighting Championship, where he became the heavyweight champion.

Ultimate Fighting Championship 
Romanov signed with the UFC on October 3, 2019, and was later scheduled to make his debut against Raphael Pessoa on April 25, 2020. However, the event was subsequently cancelled due to the COVID-19 pandemic.

Romanov was then slated to face Marcin Tybura on July 12, 2020, at UFC 251. However, Romanov was removed from the card on July 1, due to a positive COVID-19 test. He was then scheduled to face Marcos Rogério de Lima on September 5, 2020, at UFC Fight Night: Overeem vs. Sakai, but the bout was scratched the day of the event when Lima tested positive for COVID-19.

Romanov eventually made his debut on September 12, 2020, at UFC Fight Night: Waterson vs. Hill, when he defeated Roque Martinez via arm-triangle choke in the second round.

Next, he faced Marcos Rogério de Lima on November 7, 2020, at UFC on ESPN: Santos vs. Teixeira. He defeated Lima with the first forearm choke in UFC history, on the first round, to claim Performance of the Night honors.

Romanov faced Juan Espino on April 17, 2021, at UFC on ESPN: Whittaker vs. Gastelum. During the beginning of the third round, Espino accidentally connected with a knee to the groin of Romanov, who could not continue. Romanov was declared the winner via technical split decision. 6 out of 8 media scores gave it to Espino, with the other two declaring it a Draw.

Romanov faced Jared Vanderaa on October 9, 2021, at UFC Fight Night: Dern vs. Rodriguez. He won the fight via technical knockout in round two.

Romanov was next expected to face Ilir Latifi at UFC Fight Night 202 on February 19, 2022. However, the bout was cancelled for undisclosed reasons.

Replacing Rodrigo Nascimento, Romanov is scheduled to face Tanner Boser on April 23, 2022, at UFC Fight Night 205. However, on April 18, it was announced that Boser was out of the fight due to an injury.  He was replaced by Chase Sherman. However, Sherman was deemed unable to compete due to a minor health issue on the day of the event and the fight was cancelled and the pair was rescheduled for UFC on ESPN 35. Romanov won the bout via keylock submission in the first round.

Romanov faced Marcin Tybura on August 20, 2022 at UFC 278. Romanov lost the fight via a controversial majority decision. 17 of 18 MMA media outlets scored the bout as a draw.

Romanov faced Alexander Volkov on March 11, 2023 at UFC Fight Night 221. He lost the fight via technical knockout in the first round.

Personal life
Romanov was born and raised in Moldova to a Russian father and Ukrainian mother. He and his wife have three children.

Championships and accomplishments

Mixed martial arts
 Ultimate Fighting Championship
 Performance of the Night (One time) vs. Marcos Rogério de Lima
 Eagles Fighting Championship
EFC Heavyweight Championship (One time)

Mixed martial arts record

|-
|Loss
|align=center|16–2
|Alexander Volkov
|TKO (punches)
|UFC Fight Night: Yan vs. Dvalishvili
|
|align=center|1
|align=center|2:16
|Las Vegas, Nevada, United States
|
|-
|Loss
|align=center|16–1
|Marcin Tybura
|Decision (majority)
|UFC 278
|
|align=center|3
|align=center|5:00
|Salt Lake City, Utah, United States
|
|-
|Win
|align=center|16–0
|Chase Sherman
|Submission (keylock)
|UFC on ESPN: Font vs. Vera 
|
|align=center|1
|align=center|2:11
|Las Vegas, Nevada, United States
|
|-
|Win
|align=center|15–0
|Jared Vanderaa
|TKO (punches) 
|UFC Fight Night: Dern vs. Rodriguez
|
|align=center|2
|align=center|4:43
|Las Vegas, Nevada, United States
|
|-
|Win
|align=center|14–0
|Juan Espino
|Technical Decision (split)
|UFC on ESPN: Whittaker vs. Gastelum
|
|align=center|3
|align=center|1:05
|Las Vegas, Nevada, United States
|
|-
|Win
|align=center|13–0
|Marcos Rogério de Lima
|Technical Submission (forearm choke)
|UFC on ESPN: Santos vs. Teixeira
|
|align=center|1
|align=center|4:48
|Las Vegas, Nevada, United States
|
|-
| Win
| align=center| 12–0
| Roque Martinez
| Submission (arm-triangle choke)
|UFC Fight Night: Waterson vs. Hill
|
|align=center|2
|align=center|4:22
|Las Vegas, Nevada, United States
|
|-
| Win
| align=center|11–0
| Sérgio Freitas
| TKO (submission to injury)
| Eagles FC 11
| 
| align=center|1
| align=center|2:28
| Chișinău, Moldova
|
|-
| Win
| align=center|10–0
| Sultan Murtazaliev
| TKO (punches)
| Eagles FC 10
| 
| align=center|3
| align=center|2:17
| Chișinău, Moldova
|
|-
| Win
| align=center|9–0
| Virgil Zwicker
| Submission (neck crank)
|S-70: Plotforma Cup 2018
|
|align=center|1
|align=center|1:15
|Sochi, Russia
|
|-
| Win
| align=center|8–0
| Ion Grigore
|Submission (forearm choke)
| Eagles FC 9
| 
| align=center|1
| align=center|3:54
|Chișinău, Moldova
|
|-
| Win
| align=center| 7–0
| Alexander Stolyarov
| TKO (punches)
| Eagles FC 8
| 
| align=center|1
| align=center|0:36
| Chișinău, Moldova
| 
|-
| Win
| align=center| 6–0
| Ravshankhon Khusanov
| TKO (punches)
| Eagles FC 7
|
|align=Center|1
|align=center|1:37
|Chișinău, Moldova
| 
|-
| Win
| align=center| 5–0
| Yuri Gorbenko
| Submission (forearm choke)
| Eagles FC 6
| 
| align=center| 1
| align=center| 3:43
| Chișinău, Moldova
| 
|-
| Win
| align=center| 4–0
| Evgeniy Golub
| TKO (punches)
| Eagles FC 5
| 
| align=center| 1
| align=center| 0:48
| Chișinău, Moldova
| 
|-
| Win
| align=center| 3–0
| Shota Betlemidze
| Submission (rear-naked choke)
| ProFC Ukraine: Brave Hearts
| 
| align=center| 1
| align=center| 4:56
| Nikolaev, Ukraine
| 
|-
| Win
| align=center| 2–0
| Andrey Burdiniuk
| Submission (neck crank)
| Eagles FC 4
| 
| align=center| 3
| align=center| 0:43
| Chișinău, Moldova
|
|-
| Win
| align=center| 1–0
| Yuriy Protsenko
| Submission (rear-naked choke)
| Eagles FC 3
| 
| align=center| 1
| align=center| 0:50
| Chișinău, Moldova
|

See also 
 List of current UFC fighters
 List of male mixed martial artists

References

External links 
  
 

1990 births
Living people
Moldovan male mixed martial artists
Moldovan people of Russian descent
Moldovan people of Ukrainian descent
Heavyweight mixed martial artists
Mixed martial artists utilizing freestyle wrestling
Mixed martial artists utilizing Sumo
Ultimate Fighting Championship male fighters
Moldovan male sport wrestlers
Wrestlers at the 2015 European Games
20th-century Moldovan people
21st-century Moldovan people